Donja Tramošnica  (Cyrillic: Доња Трамошница) is a village in the municipalities of Pelagićevo (Republika Srpska) and Gradačac, Bosnia and Herzegovina.

Demographics 
According to the 2013 census, its population was 692, with 671 of them living in the Pelagićevo part and 21 in the Gradačac part.

References

Populated places in Gradačac